is the first work in the long-running Musha Gundam series.

SD Sengokuden was the main title at first but became a subtitle by the time SD Sengokuden Tenka Touitsu Hen was released. It ran from 1988 to 1990.

Outline 
SD Sengokuden first started in Comic World, drawn by MARSHI a.k.a. Imaishi Susumu. Comic World is the comic part of the instruction manual of BB Senshi No.17 Musha Gundam. Comic World tells the story of seven Gundams. With that concept, BB Senshi maker, Bandai together with Comic Bom Bom supplemented and expanded the story of Comic World. This led to the full-length manga series, SD Musha Gundam Fuunroku(SD武者ガンダム風雲録) with original character design by Yokoi Kouji and art by Yamato Kochi. SD Musha Gundam Fuunroku is the manga compilation of the first four works. Comic World still exists in the instruction manuals of recent Musha Gundam BB Senshi releases, but the artist wasn't always MARSHI.

The characters in the story are personified versions of the MS in Mobile Suit Gundam, Mobile Suit Zeta Gundam, Mobile Suit Gundam ZZ and Mobile Suit Gundam: Char's Counterattack.

Story
The sudden appearance of the Dark Army, led by the Yami Shougun, has turned the peaceful country to a state of war. In order to defeat the evil, Nidaime Daishougun sets up the Gundam Army, following in his father's footsteps. The Seven Mushas, servants of the Daishougun, are active in repelling the Dark Army and Yami Shougun. Little do they know that Yami Shougun is actually Zakuto, controlled by Yami Koutei, the true evil mastermind. The appearance of Yami Koutei forces the Daishougun to enter the battlefield. A climactic battle between light and dark ensues. Towards the end of the battle, Yami Koutei and Daishougun disappear in an explosion.

Characters

Gundam Army (頑駄無軍団, Gandamu Gundan)

The Seven Mushas (武者七人衆, Musha Shichinin Shuu)
Before Noomaru and Psycho join, the other five musha are also known as The Five Mushas(武者五衆, Musha Gonin Shuu).

Musha Gundam (武者頑駄無)
Design basis: Kyoshiro's Musha Gundam
Main protagonist of the chapter. Alias "Musha". He is the elder son of Shodai Shou Gundam and twin brother of Noomaru. Also the leader of the Seven Mushas and the strongest musha in the Gundam Army. The only one in the Seven Mushas without a guardian beast. He is the cousin of the current Daishougun. Will later be promoted to Sandaime Daishougun.

Musha Noomaru Gundam (武者農丸頑駄無)
Design basis: Musha Gundam Tenchi Daiga Special
Alias "Noomaru". Little brother of Musha. Was missing at a point of time and was the last to join the Seven Mushas. During the time where he was missing he was actually investigating the identity of Yami Koutei under orders of Nidaime Daishougun. At that time he had a change in appearance and was called Onmitsu Gundam(隠密頑駄無). Has a lion as guardian beast.

Musha Gundam Mark Two (武者頑駄無摩亜屈)
Design basis: Gundam Mk-II
Alias "Mark Two". Third of the seven. His father, Hayabusa Gundam, is one of the Four Beast Kings that fought alongside Shodai Shou Gundam. Previously a hunter, he saved Shodai Shou Gundam in a forest thus earning the title "Musha" and a place in the Seven Musha. During his training he gained the eagle guardian beast and learnt the ways of land air battle. Taught Noomaru nitouryu (2 sword style).

Musha Zeta Gundam (武者精太頑駄無)
Design basis: Zeta Gundam
Alias "Zeta". Forth of the seven. The strategist of the group. He came from the country of Abram, son to Bushin Gundam, another comrade of Shodai Shou Gundam. An expert horse rider and archer. Able to achieve the Centauros Special mode by fusing with his steed Oracion.

Musha Double Zeta Gundam (武者駄舞留精太頑駄無)
Design basis: Double Zeta Gundam
Alias "Double Zeta". Fifth of the seven. Son of Shishi Gundam, one of the Four Beast Kings that fought alongside Shodai Shou Gundam. The most learned of the Seven Mushas and has extensive knowledge of machinery. Starting with his guardian mecha the Musha Tank, he has invented many weapons for the Gundam Army. Has an extremely powerful hi-mega cannon on his forehead. Founder of the Machinery Clan which will cause a great effect in the future.

Musha Nyu Gundam (武者仁宇頑駄無)
Design basis: Nu Gundam (with double fin funnel)
Alias "Nyu". Sixth of the seven. Son of Ryu Gundam, one of the Four Beast Kings. After the death of his parents, he became a monk at the mountain temple of a friend of his father. There he learn from the dragon god how to control the mysterious weapon called Funnel and also gained a Koryu as a guardian beast which he can combine with to become Musha Hiryu.

Musha Psycho Gundam (武者斎胡頑駄無)
Design basis: Psycho Gundam
Alias "Psycho". Seventh of the seven. Son of Sai Gundam of the Four Beast Kings. Was the head of a bandit gang but had a change of heart after being defeated by Nyu and joined the Seven Musha. He was missing when the Seven Musha was summoned by Shodai Shou Gundam but actually Jio of the Dark Army brain washed him with a mask to make Psycho work for him. Later on in the battle the mask fell off and he returned to the Gundam Army. Buffalo, his partner from his bandit days is his guardian beast. They become Musha Bison on fusion.

Commanders
Nidaime Daishougun (二代目大将軍)
Design basis: Original
Inherited the Daishougun (lit. big general) title from his father Shodai Daishougun (Shodai means first generation) thus becoming Nidaime Daishougun (Nidaime means second generation) at a young age. After his father died he was cared for by Shodai Shou Gundam. Musha and Noomaru are his cousins. His childhood name is Raiou(雷凰). His guardian beast is Musha Phoenix and becomes Musha Fortress on combination. During the climatic clash with Yami Koutei, the Gundam Crystal at his forehead became to five fragments of light and are scattered. Weapons include the almighty Omega Cannon and his sure-killer Phoenix Attack.

Shodai Shou Gundam (初代将頑駄無)
Design basis: Perfect Gundam
Younger brother of Shodai Daishogun, father of Musha and Noomaru, Uncle to Nidaime Daishougun. He holds authority on the Gundam Army as Nidaime Daishougun is still young. Has a Tiger as a partner which he combines with to attain the Harimao Special mode. Having experienced many battles, Shou Gundam is a martial arts and weapons expert. He has fought alongside Zakuto when he was young. Like Daishougun, Shou Gundam is a title, Shodai Shou Gundam's childhood name is Ikazuchi(雷).

Hyakushiki (百士貴)
Design basis: Hyaku Shiki
Elder son of Zeon Deikun<字音太君>(then known as Hyaku no Shin<百ノ進> when he fought alongside Shodai Daishougun). His name holds the meaning of "the best in 100 warriors". Was taken into the care of Shodai Shou Gundam when his father died. Grow up to be a warrior accomplished in both literary and military arts. Together with Hyakkimaru, they too when on the mission of revealing the secret of Yami Koutei.

Hyakkimaru (百鬼丸)
Design basis: Hyaku Shiki Kai
Younger son of Zeon Deikun. After his father died he trained under the legendary shinobi Zaku Unsai, under the harsh train he became the strongest shinobi. He went on to join the Ninja Force of Gundam Army where he meets his brother again.

Others
Musha Kage Gundam (武者影頑駄無)
Part of the Secret Operations Force under direct command of Shou Gundam. Kagemusha of Musha.

Musha Kage Zeta (武者影精太)
Part of the Secret Operations Force. Kagemusha of Zeta.

Musha Kage Double Zeta (武者影駄舞留精太)
Part of the Secret Operations Force. Kagemusha of Double Zeta.
Musha Gundam Mark Three (武者頑駄無真悪参)
Design basis: Gundam Mk-III
A musha that assumes that his strength is on a par with the Seven Mushas. In his overconfidence he stole the Sacred Treasure of the Gundam Army - Shirogane no Tate (lit. Platina Shield) but on doing so he disappeared in a lightning strike. Actually he has warped to an alternate world, where his good is separated from his evil which became Knight Gundam and Satan Gundam respectively. 2 of Mark Three's descendants are featured in Shin SD Sengokuden Densetsu no Daishougun Hen and Musharetsuden Zero.

Troops
Flame Corps (火忍)
Rick Dias (里空出伊鮮姿)
Guncannon (頑巨砲)
Guntank (頑戦車)
GM II (璽武通)
GM (璽武)

Strike Force(突忍)
Dijeh (出伊慈絵)
Re-GZ (吏我髄)
Methuss (女足)
Jeagan (慈絵丸)
Nemo (音喪)

Infantry
Ball (暴留)
Jeaigan (自衛丸)

Dark Army (闇軍団, Yami Gundan)
Yami Koutei (闇皇帝)
Design basis: Original
The true mastermind and root of evil of the Dark Army. He is the person who controlled Zakuto through the Yami no Yoroi and instructed him to create chaos in Ark. No matter how many times he is defeated, even when his flash body is destroyed, he aways return to oppose the Gundams. Said to be a dark lifeform from another universe, the root of evil of the past and future to come. Yami Koutei translates to Dark Emperor.
 
Zakuto/Yami Shougun (殺駆頭/闇将軍)
Design basis: Action Zaku
Head of the Zaku Clan(殺駆一族) and sovereign of Zeon(時穏). Was a comrade of Shodai Daishougun and close friend of Shodai Shou Gundam. Wears an eyepatch to conceal an injury. He is actually a moral and kind person but after donning the Yami no Yoroi (lit. Dark Armour) he became the cruel tyrant, Yami Shougun. Both Zakuto and Yami Shogun does not share the same consciousness.

Zaku Clan(殺駆一族)
Kozaku (古殺駆)
Design basis: Zaku I
Eldest of the 3 Zaku Brothers. A staff officer in the army, uses unfair and lowly means in order to achieve victory. Loves to cut watermelons. Had katana named Kotsuki.

Konzaku (今殺駆)
Design basis: Zaku II
Second of the 3 Zaku Brothers. The rowdy guy of the three. Had katana named Kontsuki.

Shinzaku (新殺駆)
Design basis: Zaku III
Youngest of the 3 Zaku Brothers. A narcissist who cares about his appearance.

Sazaku (砂殺駆) 
 
Suizaku (水殺駆) 
 
Hizaku (高襍句) 
 
Aizaku (偵襍句) 
 
Kakure Hizaku (隠高襍句)

Doga Clan(堂我一族)
Sazabi (漣飛威)
Design basis: Sazabi
Head of the Doga Clan(堂我一族). A warrior that fight fights fairly.

Jagd Doga Gyunei (厄斗堂我・義由寧) 
 
Jagd Doga Quess (厄斗堂我・紅鋭守) 
 
Alpha Azieru (有覇悪・亜慈射) 
 
Geara Doga (義羅堂我)

Axis Clan(悪沈一族)
Kyuberei (玖辺麗)
Design basis: Qubeley
Head of the Axis Clan(悪沈一族). Former leader of a fifteen men group. In love with Hyakushiki, they settle down after the war and had a son called Hyakushikikai.

Gaza-L (我頭右) 
 
Gaza-R (我頭左)

Gaza-D (我坐出伊)

Kyonin Corps(巨忍軍団)
Jio (璽悪)
Design basis: The O
Leader of the Kyonin Corps(巨忍軍団). Said to be one of the cunning ones in the Dark Army, he secretly plans to usurp the Dark Army.

Zeong (璽御愚)

Baund Doc (弾犬)
 
Quin Mantha (紅陰慢查)

Troops
Mercenaries (僧兵軍団)
Dom (怒武)
Dowadge (怒輪津慈)
Dreissen (怒雷仙)

Solomon no Fuujin, Raijin (阻呂門の風神、雷神)
Gouf (愚怖)
Marasai (摩羅砕)

Naval Corps (水忍軍団)
Zugok (頭護津愚)
Higok (背後突)
Acguy (亜津害)
Gok (護津愚)
Kapool (河不宇留)

Air Corps (飛忍軍団)
Zeong (璽御愚)
Hambrabi (反武羅罷)
Zssa (頭査)
Asshimar (圧死魔亜)
Gabthley (我怖崇霊)

Infantry
Galbaldy a (狩刃電威有破)
Galbaldy b (狩刃電威兵蛇)
Barzam (刃亜坐武)
Galluss-J (我流速侍影)
Zako (雑魚)

The Kunos (くの一衆)
Hamma Hamma (蛮魔蛮魔)
Palace Athene (破羅守当音)

Fencer Troops (騎忍軍団)
Gyan (義夜雲)
Musha R-Jarja (武者有・邪邪 )
Bawoo (羽宇)

Doven Wolf (怒宇勉狼)

Glossary 

Gundam Army (頑駄無軍団, Gandamu Gundan) 
Motif: EFA, AEUG
The musha army commanded by the Daishougun. With Shou Gundam and the Seven Mushas as core, it is made up by the Strike Ninjas, Flame Ninjas and the lower Ninjas.

Dark Army (闇軍団, Yami Gundan) 
Motif: Zion, Titans, Neo Zion etc.
The evil musha army that opposes the Gundam Army. Formed by Yami Shougun(Zukuto) under command of Yami Koutei. It is organized with the Zaku Clan, Doga Clan, Axis Clan, Kyonin Clan as the higher tier as core, the horseman, monks, divers and air troops as middle tier and the followers of each troop as the lowest tier.

Anime
OVA 
SD Sengokuden Volume of Heaven (SD戦国伝 天の巻)（March 25, 1989)
SD Sengokuden Volume of Earth (SD戦国伝 地の巻)（March 25, 1989）
SD Sengokuden Volume of Truth (SD戦国伝 真の巻)（March 25, 1989）
SD Sengokuden Volume of Reason (SD戦国伝 理の巻)（March 25, 1989）
SD Sengokuden The Ninja Battle of Tochutei (SD戦国伝 頭虫邸の忍者合戦)（March 25, 1989）
SD Sengokuden The Mononoke extermination of the Five Mushas (SD戦国伝 頑駄無五人衆のもののけ退治)（October 25, 1990）
 
Movie
SD Sengokuden Chapter of Abaowakuu (SD戦国伝 暴終空城の章>（July 15, 1989）

References

SD Gundam